Mae Murray (born Marie Adrienne Koenig; May 10, 1885 – March 23, 1965) was an American actress, dancer, film producer, and screenwriter. Murray rose to fame during the silent film era and was known as "The Girl with the Bee-Stung Lips" and "The Gardenia of the Screen".

Early life
Murray was born in New York City, the second-oldest child of Joseph and Mary (née Miller) Koenig. Her maternal grandparents had emigrated from France while her paternal grandparents had emigrated from Germany. She had two brothers, William Robert (born November 1889) and Howard Joseph (born January 1884).

The family eventually moved to an apartment in the Lower East Side. In May 1896, Joseph Koenig, Murray's father, died from acute gastritis due to his alcoholism. To support the family, Mary Koenig took a job as a housekeeper for Harry Payne Whitney.

Career

Stage
Murray began acting on the Broadway stage in 1906 with dancer Vernon Castle. In 1908, she joined the chorus line of the Ziegfeld Follies, moving up to headliner by 1915. Murray became a star of the club circuit in both the United States and Europe, performing with Clifton Webb, Rudolph Valentino, and John Gilbert as some of her many dance partners.

Films
Murray made her motion picture debut in To Have and to Hold in 1916. She became a major star for Universal, starring with Rudolph Valentino in The Delicious Little Devil and Big Little Person in 1919. At the height of her popularity, Murray formed her own production company with her director, Robert Z. Leonard. Critics were sometimes less than thrilled with her over-the-top costumes and exaggerated emoting, but her films were popular with movie-going audiences and financially successful.

In 1925, Murray, Leonard, and Stahl produced films at Tiffany Pictures, with Souls for Sables (1925), starring Claire Windsor and Eugene O'Brien, as the first film made by Tiffany. For a brief period of time, Murray wrote a weekly column for newspaper scion William Randolph Hearst.

At her career peak in the early 1920s, Murray, along with such other notable Hollywood personalities as Cecil B. DeMille, Douglas Fairbanks, William S. Hart, Jesse L. Lasky, Harold Lloyd, Hal Roach, Donald Crisp, Conrad Nagel and Irving Thalberg was a member of the board of trustees at the Motion Picture & Television Fund – a charitable organization that offers assistance and care to those in the motion picture and television industries without resources. Four decades later, Murray herself received aid from that organization.

In the early 1920s, Murray was painted by well-known Hollywood portrait painter Theodore Lukits. This work titled Symphony in Jade and Gold (The Actress Mae Murray) (1922, private collection, northern California) depicted Murray nude, gazing in a mirror. It was exhibited at the Pacific Asia Museum in 1999 and two other venues as part of the exhibition Theodore Lukits, An American Orientalist.

Decline

Murray appeared in the title role in the Erich von Stroheim-directed film The Merry Widow (1925), opposite John Gilbert. When silent films gave way to talkies, she made an insecure debut in the new medium in Peacock Alley (1930), a remake of her earlier 1921 version Peacock Alley. In 1931, she was cast with newcomer Irene Dunne, leading man Lowell Sherman, and fellow silent screen star Norman Kerry in the talkie Bachelor Apartment. The film was critically panned at the time of release and Murray made only one more film, High Stakes (1931), also with Sherman.

A critical blow to her film career occurred after she married her fourth husband, David Mdivani, a Georgian man of minor aristocratic roots, whose brothers Serge and Alexis married actress Pola Negri and the heiress Barbara Hutton respectively. The couple married on June 27, 1926, and Mdivani became her manager, suggesting that his new wife ought to leave MGM. Murray took her husband's advice and walked out of her contract with MGM, making a powerful foe of studio boss Louis B. Mayer. Later, she would swallow her pride and pleaded to return, but Mayer would not rehire her. In effect, Mayer's hostility meant that Murray was blacklisted from working for the Hollywood studios.

Meanwhile, in 1927, Murray was sued by her then-masseuse, the famous Hollywood fitness guru Sylvia of Hollywood, for the outstanding amount of $2,125; a humiliating and detailed court case followed.

Later years
In the 1940s, Murray appeared regularly at Billy Rose's Diamond Horseshoe, a nightclub which specialized in a "Gay '90s" atmosphere, often presenting stars of the past for nostalgic value. Her appearances collected mixed reviews: her dancing (in particular the Merry Widow Waltz) was well received, but she was criticized for her youthful costumes and heavy makeup application, trying to conceal her age. In 1946, she taught ballroom dancing to young teenagers at a dance studio in Los Angeles. It was located on Crenshaw Blvd., near 48th Street.

Murray's finances continued to collapse, and for most of her later life she lived in poverty. She was the subject of an authorized biography, The Self-Enchanted (1959), written by Jane Ardmore, that has often been incorrectly called Murray's autobiography.

On the evening of February 19, 1964, 78-year-old Murray was found disoriented in St. Louis, thinking that she had completed a bus trip to New York. Murray explained to a Salvation Army officer that she had become lost trying to find her hotel, which she had forgotten the name of. She also refused bus fare back to Los Angeles as she claimed to have a ticket for the remainder of the journey in her purse, "if she could find it."

Personal life

In September 1908, in Hoboken, New Jersey, while she was appearing in the Follies of 1908, Murray married William M. Schwenker Jr. (born 1885), the unemployed son of a brewery-supply dealer, who cut off his son's allowance upon news of the wedding; they divorced in 1910. On December 18, 1916, she married former dancer and future Olympic bobsled champion Jay O'Brien. He had been married to Irene Fenwick.

After divorcing O'Brien in 1918, Murray wed movie director Robert Z. Leonard on August 18, 1918; they divorced on May 26, 1925.

Murray married her fourth husband, David Mdivani, on June 27, 1926. They had one child, Koran David Mdivani (1926-2018), before divorcing in 1933. Koran was later raised by Sara Elizabeth "Bess" Cunning of Averill Park, New York, who began taking care of him in 1936, when the child was recovering from a double mastoid operation (Cunning's brother Dr. David Cunning was the surgeon). When Murray attempted to regain custody of her son in 1939, Cunning and her other brothers, John, Ambrose, and Cortland, refused, according to The New York Times, at which time Murray and her former husband, Mdivani, entered a bitter custody dispute. It finally ended in 1940, with Murray being given legal custody of the child and the court ordering Mdivani to pay $400 a month maintenance. However, Koran Mdivani continued to live with Bess Cunning, who adopted him in 1940 under the name Daniel Michael Cunning. Reportedly, Mdivani had managed to drain nearly all of Murray's money.

Death

Many years later, Murray moved into the Motion Picture House in Woodland Hills, a retirement community for Hollywood professionals. She died there on March 23, 1965 at the age of 79. She is interred in Valhalla Memorial Park Cemetery, North Hollywood, California.

For her contribution to the motion picture industry, Mae Murray has a star on the Hollywood Walk of Fame at 6318 Hollywood Blvd. She was one of three actresses (Pola Negri and Theda Bara were the others) whose eyes were combined to form the Chicago International Film Festival's logo, a stark, black and white close-up of the composite eyes set as repeated frames in a strip of film.

Filmography

References
Notes

Bibliography
 Jane Kesner Morris Ardmore, The Self-Enchanted: Mae Murray, Image of an Era. (New York: McGraw-Hill, 1959)
 "The Rise to Stardom of Mae Murray" by Jimmy Bangley in Classic Images August 1996 (Muscatine, Iowa: Muscatine Journal, 1996)
 F. Cugat, "Mae Murray's Victory", Movie Weekly (August 19, 1922)
 Frances Marion, Off With Their Heads! (New York: The Macmillan Company, 1972)
 Adela Rogers St. Johns, "Mae Murray-A Study in Contradictions", Photoplay (July 1924), 43

External links

 
 
 Mae Murray at the Women Film Pioneers Project
 
 Mae Murray at Silents Are Golden
 Mae Murray Biography at Classic Images
 Mae Murray at Virtual History
write up on Mae Murray by Tammy Stone
 

1885 births
1965 deaths
20th-century American actresses
Actresses from New York City
American film actresses
Film producers from New York (state)
American people of German descent
American people of French descent
American silent film actresses
American stage actresses
Burials at Valhalla Memorial Park Cemetery
Metro-Goldwyn-Mayer contract players
American women screenwriters
Ziegfeld girls
Women film pioneers
Screenwriters from New York (state)
American women film producers
20th-century American women writers
20th-century American screenwriters